The seal of the City and County of San Francisco is a coat of arms that includes a shield, crest, supporters and a motto, ringed with the municipality's name.

History

The current seal was adopted in 1859 by the Board of Supervisors, and superseded a similar seal that had been adopted seven years earlier. The shield shows the Golden Gate and the hills on each side as it looked in 1859, and a paddlewheel steamship entering San Francisco Bay.

Above the shield is a crest with a phoenix, the legendary Greek bird rising from the ashes. The shield is flanked by two supporters, a miner, holding a shovel, in dexter; and a sailor, holding a sextant, in sinister, both in 1850s period clothing. At the feet of the supporters are a plow and anchor, emblems of commerce and navigation. Below the shield is a motto that reads "Oro en paz, fierro en guerra", which is Spanish for "Gold in peace, iron in war".

The official de jure description of the seal given by the San Franciscan government does not assign any specific colors to be used on renditions of the seal.

References

1859 establishments in California
San Francisco
San Francisco
San Francisco
San Francisco
San Francisco
San Francisco
San Francisco
seal
San Francisco
San Francisco
Symbols introduced in 1859